Jorge Ricardo Rial (born October 16, 1961 in Munro, Gran Buenos Aires) is an Argentine TV host and businessman.

Rial started working in newspaper media in the early 1980s and he eventually starred in the comic domestic movie Los Extermineitors.  He then got involved in TV media as a reporter of TV programme Indiscreciones hosted by Lucho Avilés in 1990s, but an acrimonious relationship developed between Rial and Avilés, causing Rial to leave the programme's staff.

Jorge Rial hosted gossip-related TV programmes El Periscopio (with Graciela Alfano, and then Andrea Frigerio), Paparazzi, Paf!. His programme Intrusos en el espectáculo is now broadcast on Argentina's América 2. He was the director of content for América 2 during 2002, but was later replaced, and he has since focused on TV media and his gossip-related "Paparazzi" magazine.  Since January 2007 he has been the host of the local version of Big Brother "Gran Hermano" on Argentina's largest broadcaster Telefe.

He wrote the book Polvo de estrellas featuring the lives of celebrities and politicians involved in farándula, and another book called "El intruso" regarding the same subject.

During the late 2009 early 2010 season he was also the main character of Angel y Demonio a play which received the Estrellas de Mar award in its category. It became a national theatrical success after a nationwide tour.

He is currently Intrusos en el espectáculo, a weekday entertainment show; the successful program of Argentina in the afternoon time (13:00-15:30) as well as the most successful program of América 2. Since March 1, 2010, he has been the host of a 9 a.m. to 12 p.m. daily radio program, Ciudad Gótika, in Radio La Red (AM 910). The program includes interviews of politicians and celebrities as well as a radio theater.

Jorge Rial has two adopted daughters: Morena and Rocío with his ex-wife Silvia D'Auro.

In 2015 he ended his relationship with Mariana Antoniale after three years.

References

 El Angel y demonio del Espectáculo se alzó con el Premio Estrella de Mar al Mejor Varieté
 Jorge Rial debutó en La Red con su Ciudad Gótika

External links
 
 Primicias Ya
 Biography of Jorge Rial at Youbioit.com (Spanish)

1956 births
Argentine male actors
Argentine journalists
Male journalists
Argentine television personalities
Living people
People from Vicente López Partido
Gran Hermano (Argentine TV series)